The 2000–2001 Perth Glory SC season was the club's fifth in the Australian National Soccer League (NSL). The club finished third on the table, losing in the elimination final to the Melbourne Knights. It was the final season in charge for head coach Bernd Stange who left the club in mid-2001.

Background
The Glory entered the 2000–01 season having lost the 2000 NSL Grand Final on penalties. The "villain" of the day, James Afkos was released by the club, signed by Marconi-Fairfield. Afkos, son of minority owner and deputy chairman Paul Afkos, claimed that he had been released on board orders, rather than a coaching decision.

Season review

Preseason
The Glory opened their preseason campaign with matches in Adelaide against the Blue Eagles (1–1) and Adelaide Force (2–1). Perth Glory returned to Perth for two matches at the WACA Ground against the Slovakia team preparing for the 2000 Olympic football tournament. The Glory lost the two matches, 0–1 and 1–5. On 20 September, the Glory defeated Inglewood United 3–1. Perth Glory and Sydney Olympic played two matches in the Pilbara region of Western Australia. The first match, in Newman ended in a scoreless draw, while the second, in Karratha was a 4–2 victory to the Glory. The final match of the preseason was a tightly contested 3–2 win over the Western Australia under-23 team.

Regular season
The season was opened with a replay of the 1999–2000 NSL grand final against Wollongong Wolves with the teams locked at one goal apiece at full time at WIN Stadium. 

The Glory began the season with a six-match unbeaten home streak, only dropping points in a 1–1 draw with Sydney Olympic in Round 4. The streak was broken with a defeat to Marconi in Round 11 when former Glory player James Afkos returned to score his first NSL goal.

Playing against the Brisbane Strikers in Round 13, the Glory set a club record high score in a 7–2 win with Damian Mori scoring four goals in the second half.

Finals series
Perth Glory finished the regular season in third place, equal on points and goal difference with Wollongong Wolves. The Wolves took second place based on a greater number of goals scored. The Glory would have taken second place but for a decision by Soccer Australia to award the Wolves a 3–0 forfeit win over Eastern Pride after their withdrawal from the league. Had Soccer Australia followed their decision to award walkovers to opponents of Carlton after their withdrawal, Perth would have finished above the Wolves. As a result of finishing third, Perth missed out on a double chance in the finals.

In the first leg of the elimination final, Perth and Melbourne Knights drew 1–1 at Knights Stadium. The match was overshadowed by a number of incidents involving members of the crowd and the Perth Glory team and supporters. During the match, Serbian-raised Glory forward Bobby Despotovski reacted to comments from the crowd supporting the Croatian-majority Knights with a three-fingered salute, a symbol of Serbian Orthodox Christianity. Members of the crowd attacked a number of players including Despotovski, Craig Deans, Gareth Naven and Jason Petkovic as they left the stadium. Coach Bernd Stange and several supporters were also attacked. Knights management claimed that a group of skinheads associated with another, un-named, Melbourne-based Croatian team were responsible.

After a mid-week investigation, the Knights were cleared to play the second leg at Subiaco Oval in Perth. The Glory and Knights drew 2–2, with the Perth team being eliminated on the away goals rule.

Coaching
Having survived an attempt by majority owner and chairman Nick Tana to replace him during the previous season, coach Bernd Stange took charge of the Glory for his last season.

In March 2001, the club placed a poll on their website asking fans to decide whether Stange should be retained beyond the current season. When the poll was removed, it was approximately 50–50 for and against keeping Stange as coach.

After the end of the 2000–01 season, Stange left the club after the completion of his contract. He was replaced by his deputy, Mich d'Avray.

Results
Legend

Preseason

League

League standings

Finals series

Squad statistics

Statistics accurate as at the end of the 2000–01 NSL season.

Transfers

In

Out

Notes

References

Perth Glory FC seasons